Lost & Found is the 18th studio album by America. Released May 5, 2015 by America Records, it is their first album of original material since Here & Now in 2007. It includes music recorded between 2000 and 2011 but not released on previous albums.   The song "Driving", an upbeat single, received some airplay and was highly regarded by many.

Track listing

Personnel
America
Gerry Beckley – lead and harmony vocals, acoustic and electric guitar, bass, mandolin, piano, organ, keyboards, drums
Dewey Bunnell – lead and harmony vocals, acoustic and electric guitars
with:
Hank Linderman – electric guitar
Dave Storrs – electric guitar
Larry Treadwell – electric guitar
Jason Scheff – bass
Bob DiChiro – bass
Ryland Steen – drums
Brian Young – drums
Jim McCarty – drums
Andrew Golomb – drums
Bobby Woods – organ, backing vocals
Nick Lane – trombone, euphonium
Charles Adelphia – oboe

Production
Gerry Beckley – tracks 1,3,5,7,9
Gerry Beckley with Dewey Bunnell – tracks 2,4,8,10
Dewey Bunnell and Bobby Woods – track 6
Jeff Larson - Executive Producer, Compiled and Archived

References

America (band) albums
2015 albums